Nataliya Strohova (born 26 December 1992) is a Ukrainian sprinter. She competed in the 200 metres event at the 2015 World Championships in Athletics in Beijing, China.

References

External links

1992 births
Living people
Ukrainian female sprinters
World Athletics Championships athletes for Ukraine
Place of birth missing (living people)
Olympic athletes of Ukraine
Athletes (track and field) at the 2016 Summer Olympics
Olympic female sprinters